Indirect single transferable voting or Gove system is a version of single transferable vote (STV), where the vote transfer is determined by the candidate's instructions and not the individual voters choices. This system allows to achieve many of the benefits of STV without the complexity of implementing a ranked voting system.
First invented by Massachusetts legislator William H. Gove of Salem and Archibald E. Dobbs of Ireland, author of Representative Reform for Ireland (1879).

Indirect single transferable voting is distinct from an indirect election by the single transferable vote, which means an election by a legislative body or electoral college (instead of the enfranchised population) using the standard (direct) single transferable vote system. Such a system is used among others in some states of India.

Application 
The indirect single transferable voting is used to elect some members of the Senate of Pakistan.

References 

 
Non-monotonic electoral systems
Preferential electoral systems
Proportional representation electoral systems
Electoral systems